This is a list of villages in Vazhapadi taluk, one of the thirteen taluks of Salem district, in the Indian state of Tamil Nadu. The taluk was covered by the Ayothiapattinam and Valapady Community Development Blocks as of the 2011 census. Ayothiapattinam block covered the western part of the taluk, while Valapady block covered the eastern part.

Revenue villages (2011)

Other villages
Thamayanoor

References

 
Vazhapadi taluk
Vazhapadi taluk